Mishkami (also, Mishkemi and Mishkami) is a village and municipality in the Masally Rayon of Azerbaijan.  It has a population of 534.

References 

Populated places in Masally District